Vieira do Minho is a municipality in the district of Braga, in the north of Portugal. The population in 2011 was 12,997, in an area of 216.44 km².

The present mayor is António Cardoso, elected by a coalition between PSD and the CDS–PP.

Parishes

Administratively, the municipality is divided into 16 civil parishes (freguesias):

 Anissó e Soutelo
 Anjos e Vilar do Chão
 Caniçada e Soengas
 Cantelães
 Eira Vedra
 Guilhofrei
 Louredo
 Mosteiro
 Parada do Bouro
 Pinheiro
 Rossas
 Ruivães e Campos
 Salamonde
 Tabuaças
 Ventosa e Cova
 Vieira do Minho

General information

Vieira do Minho is essentially a rural municipality.

Notable people 
 Senhorinha of Basto (942–982) a Portuguese Benedictine abbess
 Manuel Monteiro (born Anissó 1962) a jurist, academic professor and former politician.
 Romeu Ribeiro (born 1989) a footballer with over 350 club caps

References

External links
Municipality official website
Página Oficial Facebook

 
Towns in Portugal